Qaleh-ye Yujan (also Romanized as Qal‘eh-ye Yūjān; also known as Yūjān) is a village in Salehan Rural District, in the Central District of Khomeyn County, Markazi Province, Iran. At the 2006 census, its population was 153, in 48 families.

References 

Populated places in Khomeyn County